Birmanites is a genus of trilobites in the order Asaphida, family Asaphidae.

They lived in the Ordovician period, from the Tremadocian age until the Lower Ashgillian age (488.3-449.5 million years ago). These arthropods were a low-level epifauna, fast-moving and detritivore.

Distribution
Ordovician of Canada, China, the Czech Republic, Ireland, Italy, Sweden, the United Kingdom; Llandeilo of China; Arenigian of Argentina, China.

List
 Birmanites yunnanensis (China)

References

 Birmanites at Biolib
 Sepkoski, Jack Sepkoski's Online Genus Database – Trilobita
 Paleobiology Database

Asaphidae
Asaphida genera
Prehistoric life of Europe
Silurian trilobites
Cambrian trilobites
Ordovician trilobites of Asia
Cambrian first appearances
Silurian extinctions
Ordovician trilobites of Europe
Fossils of the Czech Republic
Letná Formation
Ordovician trilobites of South America
Fossils of Argentina
Tremadocian
Floian
Dapingian
Darriwilian
Sandbian
Paleozoic life of Quebec